Iuri Lomadze is a Georgian Greco-Roman wrestler. He won the silver medal in the 72 kg event at the 2020 European Wrestling Championships held in Rome, Italy.

Career 

In 2018, he won one of the bronze medals in the men's 72 kg event at the European Wrestling Championships held in Kaspiysk, Russia but he was stripped of his medal after testing positive for a banned substance. As a result, Daniel Cataraga of Moldova was awarded the bronze medal.

He competed in the 72 kg event at the 2019 World Wrestling Championships held in Nur-Sultan, Kazakhstan without winning a medal. He won his first match against Amin Kavianinejad but he was eliminated from the competition in his match against Sanan Suleymanov.

He competed in the 77kg event at the 2022 World Wrestling Championships held in Belgrade, Serbia.

Achievements

References

External links 
 

Living people
Year of birth missing (living people)
Place of birth missing (living people)
Male sport wrestlers from Georgia (country)
Doping cases in wrestling
Sportspeople from Georgia (country) in doping cases
European Wrestling Championships medalists
21st-century people from Georgia (country)